Craigleith Ski Club is a private alpine ski resort in Ontario, Canada, near Collingwood.  It features 5 ski lifts, 1 Surface lift, 33 trails and a terrain park with an air bag. There are 3 base lodges and a rental building at the bottom of the hill. The lodges offer services such as lockers, restrooms, food services and first aid.
Known as 'The Race Factory', Craigleith has an alpine ski racing program starting at U8 through U21 that has the largest participation in Canada. Craigleith also has park teams that compete against other private clubs in the area.
In February 2017 Craigleith hosted the Canadian Snowshoe Championships on its famous 'Switchback' trails.

Annually the club hosts the 'Podborski Cup SG race' the Nik Zoricic Cup, as well as  Alpine Ontario and FIS sanctioned races.
The club is open Wednesday through Sunday during the ski season. Corporate and Private functions (ski days, weddings, etc.) can be booked through the club office.

See also
Beaver Valley
Blue Mountain
Georgian Peaks

References

External links
Official Website